The Anthropophagic Manifesto was published in 1928 by the Brazilian poet and polemicist Oswald de Andrade, a key figure in the cultural movement of Brazilian Modernism and contributor to the publication Revista de Antropofagia. It was inspired by "Abaporu," a painting by Tarsila do Amaral, modernist artist and wife of Oswald de Andrade. The essay was translated to English in 1991 by Leslie Bary;

Content 

Written in poetic prose in the modernist style of Une Saison en Enfer by Rimbaud, the Manifesto Antropófago is more directly political than Oswald's previous manifesto, Manifesto Pau-Brasil, which was created in the interest of propagating a Brazilian poetry for export. The "Manifesto" has often been interpreted as an essay in which the main argument proposes that Brazil's history of "cannibalizing" other cultures is its greatest strength, while playing on the modernists' primitivist interest in cannibalism as an alleged tribal rite. Cannibalism becomes a way for Brazil to assert itself against European post-colonial cultural domination.

One of the Manifesto's iconic lines, written in English in the original, is "Tupi or not Tupi: that is the question." The line is simultaneously a celebration of the Tupi, who practiced certain forms of ritual cannibalism (as detailed in the 16th century writings of André Thévet, Hans Staden, and Jean de Léry), and a metaphorical instance of cannibalism: it eats Shakespeare. On the other hand, some critics argue that Antropofagia as a movement was too heterogeneous for overarching arguments to be extracted from it, and that often it had little to do with a post-colonial cultural politics.

Influences 
In the 1960s, introduced to the work of Oswald de Andrade by concrete poet Augusto de Campos, both visual artist Hélio Oiticica and musician Caetano Veloso saw the Manifesto as a major artistic influence on the Tropicália movement. Veloso has stated, "the idea of cultural cannibalism fit us, the tropicalists, like a glove. We were ‘eating’ the Beatles and Jimi Hendrix." On the 1968 album Tropicalia: ou Panis et Circensis, Gilberto Gil and Torquato Neto explicitly refer to the Manifesto in the song "Geléia geral" in the lyric "a alegria é a prova dos nove" (happiness is the proof of nines), which they follow with "e a tristeza é teu porto seguro" (and sadness is your safe harbor).

In 1990, Brazilian visual artist Antonio Peticov created a mural in honour of what would have been Andrade's 100th birthday. Momento Antropofágico com Oswald de Andrade was installed in the São Paulo Metro's Republica station. It was inspired by three of Andrade's works: O Perfeito Cozinheiro das Almas deste Mundo, Manifesto Antropofágico, and O Homem do Povo.

See also
Literature of Brazil
Tropicália

References

External links
Text in English, translation by Leslie Bary
Article in English about Antropofagia by Carlos Jauregui

Brazilian literature
Cannibalism in South America
Tropicália
Brazilian art
Satirical works
20th-century Brazilian literature